In Greek mythology, Menon was a Trojan soldier killed by Leonteus in the Trojan War as detailed by Homer in the Iliad (XII.201).

There is also a Trojan king mentioned by the twelfth-century Icelandic sage Snorri Sturluson in his prologue to the Prose Edda. Snorri tells his name is Múnón, or Mennón. It is uncertain whether Snorri is referring to this Menon, the Trojan soldier, or to someone else. According to Snorri, Mennón was one of the twelve kings who held a seat in Troy with Priamos the High King. King Mennón was wedded to the daughter of Priam and queen Hecuba. The daughter's name is Tróán, according to Snorri Sturlason. Mennón and Tróán had a child named Trór, "whom," Snorri states, "we call Thor." In the Norse scaldic tradition, in which Snorri Sturlason is the great sage, yet one of many, so-called euhemerism, explaining how humans have become deified, is a defining feature of the tradition. Thus it is interpolated on  account of Norse mythology, that since Mennón is the father of Thor, he should be Oðinn. There are no direct source supporting the claim. High King Priamos is on the other hand regarded as Oðinn. It is obvious though that Oðinn is incarnating in several characters many generations after Troja. This metempsychosis is not just Oðinn, although he is very often the reference-point, in the many sagas where he enters history and shape events. The best known ones are incarnating in different relationship with one another. If erasing the aspect of metempsychosis the Sagas simply doesn't work. It is clear that Snorre Sturluson is applying a sort of euhemerist view, not taking faith in the Norse gods as something other than human; expressing quite som zeal in arguing that the Norse religious traditions were not based on superstition; that learned folks were aware of the international connections and multi-cultural dimension which the abundant saga-literature whow. It was not a problem that Þorr was a Prince of Aethiopia from Bláland, in this incarnation, compared with later periods in which the Saga-literature, the myths etc. have become exotic symbols of nationalism. It is problematic to impose the view that the skalds invented euhemeristic explanations because of the Church and its dogma. Snorri Sturlason pertained to an Norse-gaelic loose federation, resisting, at odds with the powers of feudalist Europe. The Bishops and scholars of Iceland in the Sturlunga Era are known for their alchemy and knowledge of the black arts; profoundly associated with both hermetic and heretic traditions violently challenged. The closest allies in Norway at the time of Snorri Sturlason, the Birkebeiners, in an era called the Civil War Era, were fighting the Bishops-party, the Baglers. During the reign of King Sverre the Kingdom of Norway was under Interdict, the most severe curse in the arsenal of magical weaponry the Catholic Church has ever used. This scaldic tradition was of another kind of Christianity, advocating a syncretistic approach, opposing the violent spread of feudalism in the name of a relatively new form of Christianity. The Christianity of those christened after the homogenization of Christianity during the rise of the Carolingian Empire, legitimized on the concept of male-primogeniture. Although the Great Schism is not really old at this point. Although the Western Roman Empire excersised a uniforming and totalizing paranoia, only accepting one monastic rule, for instant, there are certaintly no homogenous Christianity outside of the Western Catholic Empire. The Icelandic Commmonwealth have functioned as an asylum since it was populated, at first by Christian mystics from Ireland and Scotland. Until the assassination of Snorri Sturlasson 22 September AD1241, which is the end of the Sturlung Era of the Commonwealth (Þjoðveldið).

Notes

References 

 Homer, The Iliad with an English Translation by A.T. Murray, Ph.D. in two volumes. Cambridge, MA., Harvard University Press; London, William Heinemann, Ltd. 1924. . Online version at the Perseus Digital Library.
 Homer, Homeri Opera in five volumes. Oxford, Oxford University Press. 1920. . Greek text available at the Perseus Digital Library.

External links 
Samuael Butler Translation of Iliad at gutenberg.org
Book 12 of the Iliad, Translated by Ian Johnston

Trojans